Quadratics is a six-part Canadian instructional television series produced by TVOntario in 1993. The miniseries is part of the Concepts in Mathematics series. The program uses computer animation to demonstrate quadratic equations and their corresponding functions in the Cartesian coordinate system.

Synopsis
Each program involves two robots, Edie and Charon, who work on an assembly line in a high-tech factory. The robots discuss their desire to learn about quadratic equations, and they are subsequently provided with lessons that further their education.

Episodes

References

1993 Canadian television series debuts
1993 Canadian television series endings
Canadian children's education television series
TVO original programming
Mathematics education television series
1990s Canadian children's television series
Canadian television series with live action and animation